Red and Black in Willisau is a live album by American jazz saxophonist Dewey Redman and drummer Ed Blackwell featuring performances recorded at the Willisau Jazz Festival in 1980 for the Italian Black Saint label.

Reception
The Allmusic review by Scott Yanow awarded the album 4 stars stating "This set of live duets from the Willisau '80 Jazz Festival succeeds due to Redman's huge sound, Blackwell's colorful rhythms, and the close interplay between the two... Although some listeners will miss the usual chordal instruments (and particularly the bass), this combination works".

Track listing
All compositions by Dewey Redman
 "Willisee" - 14:11 
 "We Hope" - 9:22 
 "F I" - 2:00 
 "Communication" - 14:10 
 "S 126 T" - 6:40 
Recorded at the Willisau Jazzfestival '80 in Switzerland on August 31, 1980

Personnel
Dewey Redman - tenor saxophone, musette
Ed Blackwell - drums

References

Black Saint/Soul Note live albums
Dewey Redman albums
Ed Blackwell live albums
1980 live albums